William John Coulson (born 14 January 1951 in Benwell, Newcastle upon Tyne) is a former professional footballer who played as a midfielder in the Football League for Southend United, Aldershot, Huddersfield Town and Darlington.

He played in Hong Kong for a number of years before moving to Melbourne where he played a season with Ringwood Whilemina and then transferred to Frankston City who later folded up because of debts. He did coaching clinic in Melbourne with George Best Bobby Charlton and Dennis Law, and a played charity match which was the last time he kicked a ball. He lived in Melbourne for 20 years before moving to Newcastle in Australia. He is still into his football and did some coaching after his retirement.

References

1950 births
Living people
Sportspeople from North Shields
Footballers from Tyne and Wear
English footballers
Association football midfielders
English Football League players
Newcastle United F.C. players
Southend United F.C. players
Aldershot F.C. players
Huddersfield Town A.F.C. players
Darlington F.C. players
Hong Kong Rangers FC players
Expatriate footballers in Hong Kong
Place of birth missing (living people)
English expatriate sportspeople in Hong Kong
English expatriate footballers